The arsenate ion is .
An arsenate (compound) is any compound that contains this ion. Arsenates are salts or esters of arsenic acid.
The arsenic atom in arsenate has a valency of 5 and is also known as pentavalent arsenic or As(V).
Arsenate resembles phosphate in many respects, since arsenic and phosphorus occur in the same group (column) of the periodic table. 
Arsenates are moderate oxidizers, with an electrode potential of +0.56 V for reduction to arsenites.

Occurrence
Arsenates occur naturally in a variety of minerals. Those minerals may contain hydrated or anhydrous arsenates. Unlike phosphates, arsenates are not lost from a mineral during weathering. Examples of arsenate-containing minerals include adamite, alarsite, annabergite, erythrite and legrandite. Where two arsenate ions are required to balance the charge in a formula, it is called diarsenate for example trizinc diarsenate, Zn3(AsO4)2.

Ions
The word arsenate is derived from arsenic acid, H3AsO4.  This moderately strong acid converts to dihydrogen arsenate, hydrogen arsenate, and arsenate, depending on pH.  The quantitative relationship between these species is defined by the acid dissociation constants:
H3AsO4  +  H2O      +  H3O+(log K1 = −2.19)
  +  H2O      +  H3O+(log K2 = −6.94)
  +  H2O      +  H3O+(log K3 = −11.5)

These values are similar to those of the hydrogen phosphates.  Hydrogen arsenate and dihydrogen arsenate predominate in aqueous solution near neutral pH.

Arsenate poisoning 
Arsenate can replace inorganic phosphate in the step of glycolysis that produces 1,3-bisphosphoglycerate from glyceraldehyde 3-phosphate. This yields 1-arseno-3-phosphoglycerate instead, which is unstable and quickly hydrolyzes, forming the next intermediate in the pathway, 3-phosphoglycerate. Therefore, glycolysis proceeds, but the ATP molecule that would be generated from 1,3-bisphosphoglycerate is lost – arsenate is an uncoupler of glycolysis, explaining its toxicity.

As with other arsenic compounds, arsenite binds to lipoic acid, inhibiting the conversion of pyruvate into acetyl-CoA, blocking the Krebs cycle and therefore resulting in further loss of ATP.

See also
:Category:Arsenates

References

Oxyanions

Arsenic(V) compounds